The Promised Land is the debut studio album by English drum and bass producer Muzz. It was released on 3 September 2020 by Monstercat.

The album was marketed with the release of six singles – "Nemesis", "Start Again", "Out There", "Somewhere Else", "Star Glide", and "The Warehouse".

Background
Muzz announced the album via a teaser posted to his social media platforms on 21 May 2020.

On 1 September, Muzz premiered the album via a live performance streamed from the Bournemouth International Centre.

Reception
The Promised Land was met with positive reception on release. Matthew Meadow from YourEDM praised the drum & bass musician for staying true to his musical style. Oliver Tryon at Cultr also praised the album, stating there was "never a dull moment" especially through Muzz's production.

Track listing

References

2020 debut albums
Drum and bass albums
Monstercat albums